Lontong cap go meh is a Chinese Indonesian take on traditional Indonesian dishes, more precisely Javanese cuisine. It is lontong rice cake served with richly-flavoured dishes which include opor ayam chicken in coconut milk, sayur lodeh vegetable soup, hot and spicy liver, hard-boiled pindang egg, koya powder made of soy and dried shrimp or beef floss, pickles, chili paste and prawn cracker. Lontong cap go meh is usually consumed by Chinese Indonesian community during the Cap go meh celebration.

Components 
Lontong cap go meh is actually not a single dish but more of a meal set with several side dishes, served in similar fashion to nasi campur or nasi Bali. It is a combination of several Javanese favourite dishes—each often prepared and cooked separately—and combined in a single plate prior to serving. The rich combination of flavourful dishes demonstrates the festive nature of the dish, which is traditionally consumed during Cap go meh in Java. The components of lontong cap go meh are:
Lontong: elongated rice cake cooked in banana leaf 
Opor ayam: chicken stew in coconut milk and spices
Sayur lodeh: vegetables in coconut milk soup, sometimes replaced by sayur labu siam (Chayote in coconut milk soup)
Sambal goreng ati: beef liver fried in sambal chili paste
Telur pindang: hard-boiled marble egg
Koya powder: a mixture of ground fried soybeans and dried shrimp powder, sometimes replaced or added with abon (beef floss)
Acar: pickles, usually consists of cucumber, carrot, shallot and birds-eye chili
Sambal: spiced chili paste with terasi shrimp paste
Kerupuk: prawn cracker, sometimes replaced by emping cracker

Origin 
Chinese cuisine's influences on Indonesian cuisine are evident in Indonesian take on Chinese dishes, such as mie goreng, lumpia, bakso and siomay. However the culinary influences also took another way around. Peranakan Chinese Indonesian cuisine has also been influenced by native Indonesian cuisine. It is believed that lontong cap go meh is a Peranakan Chinese Indonesian take on traditional Indonesian dishes.

Early Chinese immigrants in Indonesia settled in northern coastal cities of Java, such as Semarang, Pekalongan, Lasem, Tuban and Surabaya, as early as Majapahit period. During that time only male Chinese settled in Java and they intermarried with local Javanese women and created a Javanese-Chinese Peranakan culture. These early Chinese immigrants became accustomed to the cooking of their Javanese wives. To celebrate Chinese New Year, during Cap go meh, Peranakan of Java replaced the traditional yuanxiao (rice ball) with local lontong accompanied with an array of Javanese dishes such as opor ayam and sambal goreng ati (spicy beef liver). It is believed that the dish reflect the assimilation among Chinese immigrants and local Javanese community. It is believed that lontong cap go meh is full of good fortune symbols; the thick rice cake is considered richer compared to thin watery bubur (rice congee) which is often regarded as food of the poor. The elongated form of lontong also symbolizes longevity. While eggs symbolize good fortune and yellowish turmeric-coconut milk broth represents gold and fortune.

Lontong cap go meh was strictly a Peranakan-Javanese phenomena; Peranakans in the Malay Peninsula, Sumatra and Borneo are not familiar with this dish. It is commonly associated with Imlek traditions of Chinese Indonesians in Javan cities, especially Semarang. Since Betawi people (native Jakartans) were also heavily influenced by Chinese Indonesian Peranakan culture, lontong cap go meh is also considered as part of Betawi cuisine.

See also

 Ketupat sayur
 Peranakan cuisine
 Tumpeng

References

External links

 Lontong Cap Go Meh Recipe, Chinese and Javanese Dish Combine

Indonesian rice dishes
Indonesian chicken dishes
Indonesian fusion cuisine
Betawi cuisine
Indonesian Chinese cuisine
Javanese cuisine
Peranakan cuisine